Brookula proseila is a species of sea snail, a marine gastropod mollusk unassigned in the superfamily Seguenzioidea.

Description
The maximum recorded size of the shell is 1.91 mm.

Distribution
This species occurs in the Atlantic Ocean off Brazil, found at depths between 50 m and 900 m.

References

proseila
Gastropods described in 2005